Charles Raymond Davys Tuckey (15 June 1910 – 15 October 2005) was an English tennis player.

Raymond Tuckey and Pat Hughes won the doubles in Wimbledon in 1936, defeating Charles Hare and Frank Wilde in five sets. In 1937 he again reached the men's doubles finals at Wimbledon but this time lost with Pat Hughes against American team of Don Budge and Gene Mako in four sets. He was part of the winning British Davis Cup team in 1935 (against the US) and 1936 (against Australia) and of the 1937 team that lost the final to the US.

His mother, Agnes Tuckey, was, with Hope Crisp, the first winner of the Wimbledon mixed doubles in 1913. Agnes,  when in her fifties, partnered Raymond in the mixed doubles in 1931 and 1932, the only instance of a parent and child teaming up at the championships. His sister, Kay Tuckey, was also a tennis player.

Grand Slam finals

Doubles (1 title, 2 runner-ups)

References

External links
 
 
 

1910 births
2005 deaths
English male tennis players
People from Godalming
Wimbledon champions (pre-Open Era)
Grand Slam (tennis) champions in men's doubles
British male tennis players
Tennis people from Surrey